Radiale is the fifth studio album by Italian band Zu, in collaboration with  Spaceways Inc., released in 2004.

The album received an A grade from The Village Voice and was placed 8th in their Jazz Top Ten 2004.

Track list
 Canicula
 Thanatocracy
 Vegetalista
 Pharmakon
 Trash A Go-Go
 Theme De YoYo
 You And Your Folks, Me And My Folks
 We Travel The Spaceways/Space Is The Place

Line-up / Musicians
Bass – Massimo Pupillo, Nate McBride (tracks: 5 to 8) 
Drums – Hamid Drake (tracks: 5 to 8), Jacopo Battaglia 
Reeds – Ken Vandermark 
Saxophone – Luca Tommaso Mai

References

Zu (band) albums
2004 albums